William Kearsley (2 September 186319 June 1921) was an Australian politician and member of the New South Wales Legislative Assembly from 1910 until 1921. He was a member of the Labor Party (ALP) .

Kearsley was born in Stafford, England. He was educated to be a Methodist minister and emigrated to the northern New South Wales coal fields in 1888. After an initially career as a preacher he became a coal miner and was then elected as an official in the miners' union in 1907. He was elected unopposed to the seat of Northumberland at a by-election caused by the resignation of Matthew Charlton who contested the seat of Hunter at the 1910 federal election. He retained the seat of Northumberland until it was abolished at the 1913 state election. He was then elected to the seat of Cessnock and retained it until the introduction of multi-member seats and proportional representation at the 1920 state election . Kearsley was one of five members elected for the seat of Newcastle at the subsequent election. He died in the following year and was replaced by David Murray. He did not hold ministerial or party office.

References

 

1863 births
1921 deaths
People from Stafford
Members of the New South Wales Legislative Assembly
Australian Labor Party members of the Parliament of New South Wales